Bonamia is a genus of protists belonging to the family Haplosporiidae.

The genus has cosmopolitan distribution.

Species:

Bonamia exitiosa 
Bonamia ostreae 
Bonamia perspora 
Bonamia roughleyi

References

Endomyxa